St. David's Memorial Church is a historic building in the township of Cave, South Canterbury.

History 
It was designed in 1930 by Herbert W. Hall. The building was awarded the New Zealand Institute of Architects gold medal in 1934. It was built for Thomas Burnett in memory of his father Andrew Burnett (1838–1927) and his mother Catherine (1837–1914), as well as to commemorate other pioneering run-holders who took up runs in the Mackenzie country.

References

External links 
 http://www.rootsweb.ancestry.com/~nzlscant/cavechurches.htm

Heritage New Zealand Category 1 historic places in Canterbury, New Zealand
Listed churches in New Zealand
Churches completed in 1930
Stone churches in New Zealand